Lebedyata is a rural locality (a village) in Osintsevskoye Rural Settlement, Kishertsky District, Perm Krai, Russia. The population was 13 as of 2010.

Geography 
Lebedyata is located 32 km southeast of Ust-Kishert (the district's administrative centre) by road. Yevdokino is the nearest rural locality.

References 

Rural localities in Kishertsky District